Parliamentary elections were held in Burundi on 4 July 2005. The result was a victory for the National Council for the Defense of Democracy – Forces for the Defense of Democracy (CNDD–FDD), which won 64 of the 118 seats in the National Assembly

Conduct
Voting was largely peaceful throughout the country during election day. Observers deemed the polls generally free, fair, and transparent while the major political parties accepted the results as legitimate.

Results

National Assembly
In order to ensure the 60%-40% ethnic split and 30% quota for women, a further 18 members, including the three Twa representatives foreseen by the Electoral Code, were co-opted after the elections.

Senate
Following the National Assembly elections, the Senate was indirectly elected on 29 July. Of the 49 Senate members, 34 were elected by electoral colleges formed by councillors, three were co-opted Twas, four were former Presidents, and eight further members were co-opted to ensure that at least 30% of its members were women. A total of 119 candidates stood for election to the Senate.

References

External links
Burundi: Elections held in 2005 IPU
2005 elections IFES
Republic of Burundi Legislative Elections of 4 July 2005 Adam Carr

Elections in Burundi
Burundi
Election, legislative
Election and referendum articles with incomplete results